Koparan (formerly: Yenikaradona) is a village in the Çorum District of Çorum Province in Turkey. Its population is 64 (2022).

References

Villages in Çorum District